The 2008 Milan–San Remo cycling race took place on March 22, 2008, and was won by Fabian Cancellara. It was the 99th edition of the Milan–San Remo monument classic. It was three kilometres longer than 2007, at 298 km, following the addition of the Le Mànie climb, which was due to roadworks along the previously planned route. The race concluded on Lungomare Italo Calvino and not on the traditional Via Roma due to construction and the Easter weekend.

Last year's winner Óscar Freire was the favourite with bookmakers, following his recent double stage victory at the Tirreno–Adriatico.

Results

References

External links
Cyclingnews preview

Milan–San Remo
Milan - San Remo
Milan - San Remo, 2008
Milan - San Remo